Sing About Life is the debut studio album by Australian three-piece folk group Tiddas. The album was released in November 1993 and peaked at number 36 on the ARIA Charts and was certified gold in Australia. The album was re-released in 1994 with a bonus live disc.

At the ARIA Music Awards of 1994, the album received two nominations; ARIA Award for Breakthrough Artist - Album and ARIA Award for Best Indigenous Release, winning the ARIA for Best Indigenous Release.

Background and release
In 2016, member Lou Bennett recalled that they could sit around the kitchen table and sing all day. They'd start early in the morning, sharing and writing songs, working out harmonies, having short breaks and almost forgetting to eat. They were just too busy having a damn good time together. Bennett recalled that the making of Sing About Life was an "intensely emotional time" and it was not uncommon for the members to argue, make up, then do it all again adding "it wasn't animosity though, it was creative tension." 
Bennett said the band came to be known as 'difficult women' because they weren't about to say yes to whatever expectations were put on them to fit into a marketing model in order to sell records. Tiddas stood their ground, knowing that being told to lose weight, wear different clothes and pluck their eyebrows had nothing to do with their development as artists.

Track listing

Charts

Certifications

Release history

References

1993 debut albums
Tiddas (band) albums
ARIA Award-winning albums